Foothill Horizons Outdoor School is an outdoor school located in Sonora, California. The center's formal name is Neal E. Wade Outdoor Education Center. It is operated by the Stanislaus County Office of Education. Stanislaus County Office of Education has been operating an Outdoor Education program for over 50 years.

The current director is Pam Ivie.

References

External links
Official Foothill Horizons Outdoor School website

Schools in California
Education in Tuolumne County, California
Environmental education in the United States
Outdoor education organizations
Sonora, California